Ian Chandler (born 20 March 1968) is an English former professional footballer. He is currently manager of Northern League club Bishop Auckland.

Football career

Playing career

In the Football League

Chandler, a forward, represented England as a schoolboy before joining Barnsley as an apprentice. He turned professional in August 1986 and made his league debut the following season. He made a bright start to his Barnsley career, scoring four times in 12 games that first season, but lost his place and failed to make any further appearances for Barnsley.

He joined Stockport County on loan in August 1987 and moved to Aldershot in August 1988.

Into Non-League football
After leaving Aldershot in 1989 he trained as an accountant and moved into non-league football with Whitley Bay. He spent six years with Bay, scoring 120 goals in 260 appearances, moving to Durham City in 1995. He subsequently played for South Shields, Durham City again, and Blyth Spartans before rejoining Whitley Bay in the 2001 close-season.

On 12 May 2002 Chandler scored against Tiptree United with a powerful header in extra-time at Villa Park to win the FA Vase for Whitley Bay for the first time in their history. He left Bay in July 2003, joining Bishop Auckland, but was released in September 2003 and, after a short spell with Jarrow Roofing, rejoined Whitley Bay as player-manager in January 2004.

Managerial career
On 10 May 2009, Chandler led Whitey Bay to their second FA Vase triumph beating Glossope North End, becoming the first man in the competition's history to win as both player and manager. The club retained the FA Vase the following season with a 6–1 win over Wroxham. They retained the trophy again in 2011, beating Coalville Town 3–2 in the final, becoming the first club to win the competition four times and the first to win it three years in succession. In this successful period Chandler became known for his 3-5-2 formation which went out of fashion in the early 90s.

Chandler resigned from the Whitley Bay job in 2014. Later in the year he was appointed manager of Durham City. However, he left the club in October 2015. He returned to Whitley Bay as caretaker manager in February 2016, managing the club until the end of the 2015–16 season.

In May 2018 he was appointed manager of Bishop Auckland.

References

1968 births
Footballers from Sunderland
Living people
English footballers
Barnsley F.C. players
Stockport County F.C. players
Aldershot F.C. players
Whitley Bay F.C. players
Durham City A.F.C. players
South Shields F.C. (1974) players
Blyth Spartans A.F.C. players
Bishop Auckland F.C. players
Jarrow Roofing Boldon Community Association F.C. players
English Football League players
Whitley Bay F.C. managers
Durham City A.F.C. managers
Bishop Auckland F.C. managers
Association football forwards
English football managers